"Royals" is a song by singer Paul Rey, released as a single on 25 February 2023. It was performed in Melodifestivalen 2023.

Track listing

Charts

References

2023 songs
2023 singles
Melodifestivalen songs of 2023